GAK is an EP by Richard D. James (Aphex Twin) released in 1994 under the one off moniker "GAK". The record is sourced from demos Richard D. James sent to Warp Records in 1990 prior to his signing. The album is rumored to be an imitation of the classic Warp artist LFO. James recorded the songs possibly around 1989–1990.

GAK 1 Is an example of early techno, mainly structured around a repetitive CR-78 pattern with a piano melody. GAK 2 is similar but has a more ambient techno sound than any other tracks on the E.P. GAK 3, however is a much darker, track with racing synths and a hard 4–4 beat, one of James' attempts to create a more rave type of sound. This album was released both in CD digital and 12" formats. The cover artwork features GAK written on the top and the Warp logo at the bottom on a purple background. The cover artwork is by The Designers Republic.

Track listing

References 

 http://www.allmusic.com/album/gak-mw0000978659
 https://aphextwin.warp.net/release/85681-gak-gak
 https://www.discogs.com/GAK-GAK/master/80343

1994 EPs
Aphex Twin EPs
Albums with cover art by The Designers Republic